Damias is a genus of moths in the family Erebidae. The genus was erected by Jean Baptiste Boisduval in 1832.

Species

References

External links

 
Lithosiini
Moth genera